The Duna Federico Kirbus is the highest sand dune in the world, located in the northwest of Argentina, in the Catamarca Province. It has a height of 1,230 metres (4,035 ft), the dune is taller than the highest point of 53 UN-recognised sovereign states. It is part of the Bolsón de Fiambalá, a semicircular sand valley.

The dune is named after Argentinian journalist and researcher Federico Kirbus, who discovered its real height.

References

Dunes of Argentina
Landforms of Catamarca Province